Rohrbach an der Lafnitz is a municipality in Styria, Austria. It is in the judicial district of Hartberg and the political district of Hartberg-Fürstenfeld.

Geography
It is located where the River Limbach joins the Lafnitz. The municipality is too small to be subdivided.

Transport
Rohrbach an der Lafnitz has good transportation connections.

The Rohrbach-Vorau station on the Thermenbahn provides a rail connection to Vienna and Hartberg.

Education
The municipality has a kindergarten, a Volksschule and a Neue Mittelschule.

Registered landmarks
The Roman Catholic parish church of St. Joseph the Worker, built overlooking the town in 1959–1961, was designed by Eberhardt Jäger and contains a triptych stained glass window by Margret Bilger.
The so-called Zeilbrücke is a lenticular truss bridge carrying the Thermenbahn across the Lafnitz valley. The bridge is shared between Eichberg, Rohrbach and Schlag bei Thalberg; the centre of the river constitutes the border between the latter two.

Notable residents
 Hans Gross (1930–1992) was made an honorary citizen of Rohrbach an der Lafnitz in 1984.

References

External links

Cities and towns in Hartberg-Fürstenfeld District